Louis Höflinger (fl. 19th century) was a Baltic-German artist and photographer, who worked in Estonia.

Before moving to Estonia, he lived in Hessen, Germany. In 1857 he acquired Georg Friedrich Schlater's lithography studio in Tartu. He worked together with the draughtsman Eduard Ivanson (Iwansohn).

Works

References

Baltic-German people
19th-century Estonian painters
19th-century Estonian male artists
Estonian photographers
Year of birth missing
Year of death missing